("Girls in Uniform") is a 1931 German romantic drama film based on the play  (Yesterday and Today) by Christa Winsloe and directed by Leontine Sagan with artistic direction from Carl Froelich, who also funded the film. Winsloe also wrote the screenplay and was on the set during filming. The film remains an international cult classic.

Plot 
Manuela von Meinhardis, whose mother had died when she was young and whose father serves in the military, is enrolled at an all-girls boarding school headed by the traditional and iron-fisted Fräulein von Nordeck zur Nidden. Manuela feels out of place in this strict environment. After witnessing Fräulein von Bernburg's compassion for the other girls, Manuela develops a passionate love for her teacher. The first spark of love begins with a goodnight kiss. Manuela receives this goodnight kiss on her first night at the school and, while the teacher normally gives all the girls a goodnight kiss on the forehead, Fräulein von Bernburg kisses Manuela on the lips. 

After not knowing her recitation for Fräulein von Bernburg’s class, Manuela is asked to meet her in her room. Fräulein von Bernburg comments on the state of Manuela’s clothes and gives Manuela one of her own petticoats. Manuela begins to weep and, after some time, confesses her love to Fräulein von Bernburg, who says that she cannot give Manuela special treatment. Shortly after, Ilsa von Westhagen, another student, writes a letter to her parents about the conditions of the school and has a worker smuggle it out.  

When the girls prepare to put on the play Don Carlos by Friedrich Schiller for the headmistress’s birthday, Manuela plays the lead male role, Don Carlos. Ilsa is also supposed to play a large role but is not allowed to perform after her letter is returned to the school. The play is a success, and Fräulein von Bernburg is moved. During the afterparty, the girls are served punch containing alcohol. Manuela drunkenly confesses her love for Fräulein von Bernburg and tells everyone about the petticoat. The headmistress overhears and Manuela passes out after her speech.  

The headmistress puts her in solitary, but Manuela is moved out of solitary when the princess arrives at the school. After the princess leaves, the headmistress scolds Fräulein von Bernburg’s closeness with her students. Fräulein von Bernburg calls Manuela to her office and explains that Manuela is never to speak to her again.  

Upon leaving Fräulein’s von Bernburg’s office, Manuela prepares to jump from several stories up in the main staircase. The girls save her, and both Fräulein von Bernburg and the headmistress are shaken. The movie ends with all the girls watching the headmistress as she slowly walks down the stairwell and down the hall in shaken silence.

Cast

Production

Winsloe's stage play had previously appeared under the title  (Knight Nérestan) in Leipzig with Hertha Thiele and Claire Harden in the lead roles.

It was largely shot at the Potsdam military orphanage, now a teacher training college for women. Carl Froelich's studio in Berlin-Tempelhof was also used. Although sound had only been used for two years in cinema, it was used artfully.

The film was groundbreaking in having an all-female cast; in its sympathetic portrayal of lesbian "pedagogical eros" (see Gustav Wyneken) and homoeroticism, revolving around the passionate love of a fourteen-year-old (Manuela) for her teacher (von Bernburg); and in its co-operative and profit-sharing financial arrangements (although these failed).

After many screen tests, Winsloe had insisted that her friend Thiele play the lead role. Director Sagan preferred Gina Falckenberg who had done the role on stage in Berlin, but along with having played Manuela in Leipzig, Thiele had played a young lesbian in Ferdinand Bruckner's stage play  (The Creature) and although 23 years old when filming began, she was considered to be more capable of portraying a 14-year-old girl.

Reaction

The film had some impact in the Berlin lesbian clubs, but was largely eclipsed by the ongoing cult success of Der blaue Engel (1930). The film did, however, generate large amounts of fan mail to the stars from all over Germany and was considered a success throughout much of Europe. The goodnight kiss Hertha Thiele (Manuela) received from Dorothea Wieck (Fräulein von Bernburg) was especially popular. One distributor even asked for more footage of other kisses like it to splice into prints of the film.

Despite the collective nature of the filming for which cast and crew received only a quarter of the normal wage, none saw a share of the six million Reichsmarks and Thiele later hinted that the profits had been mostly retained by the producers.

The film was distributed outside Germany and was a huge success in Romania. During a 1980 interview, Thiele said the school play scene caused a "longstockings and kissing" cult when the film was first shown there. It was also distributed in Japan, the United States, England and France.

 won the audience referendum for Best Technical Perfection at the Venice Film Festival in 1932 and received the Japanese Kinema Junpo Award for Best Foreign Language Film (Tokyo, 1934).

Later, an alternate ending which subtly pandered to pro-Nazi ideals enabled continued screening in German cinemas. Eventually even this version of the film was banned as 'decadent' by the Nazi regime, which reportedly attempted to burn all of the existing prints. By then, though, several had been dispersed around the world. Leontine Sagan (director) and many others associated with the film fled Germany soon after the banning. Many of the cast and crew were Jewish, and those who could not escape from Germany died in the camps. Assistant director Walter Supper killed himself when it became clear his Jewish wife would be arrested.

The film is said to have inspired the 1949 novel Olivia by Dorothy Bussy, which treats very similar themes, and which was made into a French film Olivia (1951) directed by Jacqueline Audry. 

There is a German remake of the film produced in 1958. Mädchen in Uniform (1958) was directed by Géze von Radványi and starred Lilli Palmer, Romy Schneider, and Therese Giehse. In this remake, the political criticism on the Prussian Center and the love story between the main characters was played down. Manuela comes to see Fräulein von Bernburg as a motherly figure rather than a romantic one.

There was another remake made in Mexico in 1950. The film is entitled Muchachas de uniforme and was directed by Alfredo B. Crevenna. Other films that were inspired by the themes in Mädchen in Uniform are Lost and Delirious (Lea Pool, Canada 2001) and Loving Annabella (Katherine Brooks, 2006). Mädchen in Uniform was also the inspiration for René Pollesch's play Mädchen in Uniform -- Wege aus der Selbstverwirklichung at the German Playhouse in Hamburg (2010).

Censorship and surviving version

On October 1, 1931, a ban was placed on Mädchen in Uniform at the first inspection committee showing which forbad young people from viewing. On April 8, 1932, the decision for a 2480m shortened version was confirmed.  

The film was released internationally and was very successful. The film had success particularly in Japan, the USA, France, Great Britain, and Mexico. In 1934 the film brought in 6 million Reichsmarks, while the production costs were only 55,000 Reichsmarks. 

During the National Socialist rule in Germany, Mädchen in Uniform was banned by Joseph Goebbels, the Reich Minister of Propaganda. The film was only allowed to be shown abroad. This ban was not so much about the lesbian theme of the film, but rather the depictions of Prussian ruthlessness and the criticisms on authority and discipline.  

At the FSK-Test on December 8, 1949, the film was approved again and the restrictions were lifted. The film was then unofficially distributed as a video shown in women’s centers. After that, the first public reproduction was in 1977 when a West German broadcasting organization decided to broadcast the film.

The film was almost banned in the U.S., but Eleanor Roosevelt spoke highly of the film, resulting in the film getting a limited release in the US in 1932–33. Prints of the film survived the war, but it was censored heavily until the 1970s, and it was not shown again in Germany until 1977 when it was screened on television.

In 1978, Janus Films and Arthur Krim arranged for a limited re-release in the US in 35mm, including a screening at the Roxie Cinema in San Francisco. Also in 1978, the film was released in its surviving form by Janus Films on VHS with English subtitles.

Versions were released in the U.S. (1994) and the UK (2000) by the British Film Institute.

Quotation from the film
"What you call sin, I call the great spirit of love, which takes a thousand forms." (Spoken in reference to the boycott.)

In popular culture
 In Anthony Powell's novel The Acceptance World (1955), the narrator, Nick Jenkins, is re-united with his first major love, Jean Templer, after Jean and her sister-in-law, Mona, have returned to the Ritz (London) on New Year's Eve 1931, following a screening of the film. Jean is accompanied by her brother Peter. Nick (who has seen the film) is mildly mocked by his old schoolfriend Peter (who has not), for saying that the film is not primarily about lesbians.
 In the film Henry & June (1990), this is one of the films shown in the small art-house theater frequented by the main characters.
The film Loving Annabelle (2006) was reportedly inspired by Mädchen in Uniform.
The album Mädchen in Uniform (2009) by the Austrian band Nachtmahr.

See also 
List of German films of 1919–1932
German Expressionism
List of LGBT-related films
List of LGBT-related films directed by women

References

Further reading
 Sara Gwenllian Jones. "Mädchen in Uniform: the story of a film". PerVersions: the international journal of gay and lesbian studies, issue 6, Winter 1995/96.
 B. Ruby Rich. "From Repressive Tolerance to Erotic Liberation: Maedchen in Uniform", Jump Cut, no. 24/25, March 1981 and Radical America, Vol. 15, no. 6, 1982; and also reprinted with additional material in B. Ruby Rich, Chick Flicks: Theories and Memories of the Feminist Film Movement (Durham, NC: Duke University Press, 1998)
 Loren Kruger, Lights and Shadows: The Autobiography of Leontine Sagan (Johannesburg, South Africa: Witwatersand University Press, 1996)

External links

Synopsis, essay and 1980 interview with Hertha Thiele
Photographs and bibliography
Videographic study of the three versions of Mädchen in Uniform with essay about the Mexican remake

1931 films
1931 romantic drama films
1930s German-language films
1930s LGBT-related films
Films set in boarding schools
Films about educators
Films about teacher–student relationships
Films featuring an all-female cast
Films of the Weimar Republic
German black-and-white films
German films based on plays
German LGBT-related films
German romantic drama films
Lesbian-related films
LGBT-related romantic drama films
1930s German films